ETSI and 3rd Generation Partnership Project (3GPP) standards, such as GSM and LTE, define supplementary service codes that make it possible to query and set certain service parameters (e.g., call forwarding) directly from mobile devices.

See also
 Global System for Mobile Communications
 GSM services: Supplementary Services
 Vertical service code
 GSM USSD codes - Unstructured Supplementary Service Data: list of standard GSM codes for network and SIM related functions

External links
 3GPP TS 22.030
 GSM Feature Codes
GSM Features That Aren't Widely Known
 What’s the difference between USSD, MMI and SS codes?

Mobile telecommunications standards
3GPP standards